Judiel Nieva (born 1977), also known as Angel de la Vega, is a Filipino transgender, actress and businesswoman, notable for her claims of seeing a vision of the Virgin Mary atop a guava tree in Agoo, La Union, Philippines in what was labeled as the "Miracle of Agoo" from 1989 until 1993. The Roman Catholic Church officially declared Nieva's visions as non-supernatural in 1993.

Early life
Nieva is the seventh of eight children. Her parents Pedro and Julia Nieva sold goods out of two stalls which they operated in the local market. Even as a young child, Nieva was believed to have special powers and was sought out as a healer.

Alleged Marian visions

Nieva claimed to have begun seeing visions of the Virgin Mary in 1987 when she was only 10 years old. On March 31, 1989, she reported that the first of several public apparitions, in which she claimed to have seen a bright light, then heard voices and the sounds of trumpets while angels descended from heaven towards her singing "Allelulia" and "Salve Regina".

The Holy Family next appeared on a cloud, St. Joseph holding a shepherd's staff and the Virgin Mary sitting on a rock holding the baby Jesus on her lap.

Description of Mary
The description of the Blessed Virgin Mary according to Nieva's personalized statue is distinct. The Virgin Mary wears a long white tunic, and stands atop a (Guava) tree resting on a cloud decorated with seven roses. The virgin has a six-pointed star on the forehead, and has a "Sailor knot" featuring a tassel and a golden chain ball hanging from her chest.

The Marian title associated with the weeping statue later became known as "Our Lady of Agoo, Immaculate Queen of Heaven and Earth" and features seven roses atop a cloud where the virgin stands.

The public was initially inclined to believe Nieva's claims. On March 6, 1993, during a "manifestation" on "Apparition Hill", an estimated one million people gathered to witness a "visitation" from the Virgin Mary. Numerous government officials, media personalities and even a Catholic bishop attested to the veracity of these events.

In 1993, a theological commission established by Bishop Salvador Lazo Lazo condemned the aforementioned events as Constat de Non Supernaturalitate (Latin, "clearly evident to be not supernatural"). Accounts reported in the news media regarding the financial corruption of the discredited seer's family and her own transsexualism were seen as proof of this finding.

The statue was reported to have wept tears of blood on three separate occasions.

In 2003, Nieva, who now calls herself by the screen name "Angel dela Vega", starred in a film entitled "Siklo". In the film, she plays a woman who falls in love with her neighbor.

References

External links
Image of Angel dela Vega in Boracay

1977 births
Living people
Filipino film actresses
Transgender women
Marian visionaries
Angelic visionaries
LGBT Roman Catholics
Filipino LGBT actors
Filipino transgender people
People from La Union
Visions of Jesus and Mary